Mount Santa Rita was a facility of the United States Navy in Bataan, Philippines.  It was the U.S. Naval Link Station (USNAVLINKSTA) within the Philippines.  There were approximately 15 people that were permanently attached to this station at any given time, while there were also seven Marine guards who rotated every seven days. These Marine Guards were members of Alpha Company Marine Barracks, Subic Bay. Other than military personnel, there were Philippine nationals that worked there as well.

Facilities 
The tower had 5 microwave links which transmitted to Subic Bay Naval Base, Clark Air Base, Naval Air Station Cubi Point, San Miguel Naval Communications Station (NAVCOMSTAPHIL), Sangley Point Naval Base and the United States Embassy in Manila.

History 
During the Vietnam War, all communications from Vietnam went through Santa Rita.  The link started in Nha Trang, then came to the Philippines via underwater cable to NAVCOMSTAPHIL, through Mt. Santa Rita to Clark AB and then to the HF transmitter site at the Naval Communication Transmitting Facility, Capas in Tarlac, which transmitted to the US Mainland.

References
History of Mount Santa Rita Naval Link Station

See also 
U.S. Naval Radio Facility Bagobantay

Military facilities in Zambales
History of Zambales
Communications and electronic installations of the United States Navy
Military installations closed in 1991
Installations of the United States Navy in the Philippines
1991 disestablishments in the Philippines

Closed installations of the United States Navy